Christopher John Nunn, OAM (born 18 December 1958) is an Australian athletics coach. He was the head coach of the Australian athletics team at the 2000 Sydney Paralympics.

Personal life
He was born in Maffra, Victoria on 18 December 1958 and lived his first eight years in the nearby town of Heyfield. Nunn has a brother and two sisters and in 1976, his family moved to a farm called Leura Hill near Myponga in South Australia. He attended Yankalilla Area School, his interest in sport, particularly athletics, was heightened through the school's physical education teacher, Lance Rosser. After leaving school, he worked as an insurance clerk for two years in Adelaide. In addition, he and athletics friend Robin Gorringe coached athletics during the school holidays.

In 1985, he graduated with a Bachelor of Education in physical education and biology at the South Australian College of Advanced Education, now the University of South Australia. In 1990, after teaching for four years in several South Australian high schools, Chris and his new partner Vicki opened a general store in Port Vincent. With wife Vicki, he has four children; he was previously married to Olympic athlete Glynis Nunn (née Saunders). Chris Nunn has stated that the greatest influences on his life have been his parents, Lance Rosser and Dr John Daly, Australian athletics Olympic coach.

Chris and his wife Vicki are heavily involved in local athletics.

Athletics career

In 1981, he moved to Brisbane to be closer to his partner and athlete Glynis Nunn (née Saunders). Due to the lack of coaching in Brisbane, they returned to Adelaide. He won national title medals in men's 110m hurdles and decathlon. He and Glynis competed at the 1982 Commonwealth Games in Brisbane. He competed in the men's decathlon but withdrew during the event due to injury. At the 1984 Olympic Games in Los Angeles, his wife Glynis won the gold medal in the women's heptathlon. In the lead up to the Games, he coached his wife in shot put and javelin. He retired from competitive athletics in 1989.

Paralympic career

Nunn attended the 1988 Summer Paralympics in Seoul as a support coach for amputee track and field athletes. In December 1990, he was offered a part-time coaching position in the new Athletes with a Disability program at the Australian Institute of Sport (AIS). In conjunction with this position, he was contracted to write the book Coaching Amputee Athletes. He held this position for five years before being promoted to head coach of the program in 1996. Nunn has stated that he was the first paid athletics with a disability coach in the world. He has directly coached notable Australian athletes – John Eden, Hamish MacDonald, Rodney Nugent and David Evans and advised many other leading Australian Paralympic athletes. He attended four successive Paralympic Games from 1988 to 2000 as an athletics coach and was head athletics coach at the 2000 Sydney Games.  At the 2000 Games, the Australian athletics team won 35 gold, 15 silver and 16 bronze medals. In November 2000, he was appointed head coach of the Australian Institute of Sport Athletics program. Nunn's appointment resulted in the integration of athletes with a disability into the AIS Athletics program. In 2002, he was awarded a medal of the Order of Australia for services as a coach of athletes with a disability, particularly Australian Paralympic athletes.

In 2003, Athletics Australia and the AIS decided to restructure the AIS program and appointed a high performance manager. Nunn's position was downgraded to senior throws coach and he subsequently left the AIS. Whilst at the AIS, Nunn played a significant role in establishing, developing and gaining acceptance of high performance programs for athletes with a disability. In 2004, he established a King's Swim School in the Canberra suburb of Macgregor. Nunn returned to high performance sport in 2009 when he was appointed manager of high performance, Australian Paralympic Committee. He still plays an active role in junior sport as a coach at Ginninderra Tiger Athletics.

In November 2013, Nunn was appointed chef de mission for the Australian Team for the 2014 Sochi Winter Paralympics. He replaced Kate McLoughlin who stepped down due to family reasons.

Recognition

 1994, 1996, 1998 – Australian Coaching Council Individual Coach Award Finalist
 1996 – Australian Coaching Council Eunice Gill Award
 1998 – Australian Paralympic Coach of the Year
 Confederation of Australian Sport Dawn Fraser Award
 1994 to 1996 – Chairman of the Athletics Committee of the International Sports Organisation for the Disabled
 2000 – Australian Sports Medal
 2002 – Medal of the Order of Australia
 2003 – Rotary Clubs of Canberra and Woden Paul Harris Fellowship
2015 - ACT Sport Hall of Fame inductee

References

External links

Chris Nunn interviewed by Mick Fogarty in the Australian Centre for Paralympic Studies oral history project, National Library of Australia

Australian athletics coaches
Paralympic coaches of Australia
Coaches at the 1988 Summer Paralympics
Coaches at the 1992 Summer Paralympics
Coaches at the 1996 Summer Paralympics
Coaches at the 2000 Summer Paralympics
Paralympic athletics (track and field) coaches
Recipients of the Medal of the Order of Australia
Recipients of the Australian Sports Medal
Athletes (track and field) at the 1982 Commonwealth Games
Commonwealth Games competitors for Australia
Australian Institute of Sport coaches
1958 births
Living people
Australian male hurdlers
People from Maffra